The Maserati 4CM is an open-wheel Grand Prix motor racing car, designed, developed and built by Italian manufacturer Maserati, in 1931.

In 1930, Maserati decided to concentrate its efforts on the voiturette class, which was not contested by  German manufacturers such as Mercedes-Benz and Auto Union. The  Tipo 4CM was Maserati's first racing voiturette. The name of the car is derived as follows:

4: 4 cylinders engine

C : Corsa, for racing

M : Monoposto, for single seater

Some cars came with a spare cylinder block, pistons, connecting rods and supercharger enabling it to be converted to  when required.

It succeeded the Maserati Tipo 26M, and was itself slowly replaced by the Maserati 6CM around 1936.

References

4CM
Grand Prix cars